Moore Pinnacle is a solitary peak rising to  in the southern part of Mount Olympus, in the Britannia Range, Antarctica.

References

Mountains of Oates Land